General elections were held in Kenya in February 1961. The result was a victory for the Kenya African National Union, which won 19 of the 53 elected seats.

Electoral system
Twenty seats were reserved for minority communities; ten for whites, eight for Indians and two for Arabs. There were also twelve appointees. Primary elections were held for the reserved seats by members of the respective communities, and candidates receiving at least 25% of the vote advanced to the main elections.

Of the 1,411,117 registered voters, 29,879 (2.18%) were Indian, 19,332 (1.37%) white and 5,472 (0.38%) Arabs.

Results
Nine constituencies (with a total of 353,251 registered voters) were uncontested, reducing the number of actual voters to 1,057,866.

References

Elections in Kenya
1961 in Kenya
Kenya
Legislative Council of Kenya